Verkhnyaya Vayenga is a rural locality (a village) in Osinovskoye Rural Settlement of Vinogradovsky District, Arkhangelsk Oblast, Russia. The population was 31 as of 2010. There are 4 streets.

Geography 
Verkhnyaya Vayenga is located 26 km east of Bereznik (the district's administrative centre) by road. Kvakhtyuga is the nearest rural locality.

References 

Rural localities in Vinogradovsky District